Mixojapyx is a genus of diplurans in the family Japygidae.

Species
 Mixojapyx barberi Ewing & Fox, 1942
 Mixojapyx conspicuus Silvestri, 1933
 Mixojapyx cooki Ewing & Fox, 1942
 Mixojapyx dampfi Silvestri, 1948
 Mixojapyx dechambrieri Pagés, 1977
 Mixojapyx impar Silvestri, 1948
 Mixojapyx notabilis Silvestri, 1948
 Mixojapyx reddelli Muegge, 1992
 Mixojapyx riggii Silvestri, 1948
 Mixojapyx saussurei (Humbert, 1868)
 Mixojapyx tridenticulatus (Fox, 1941)

References

Diplura